Ensemble Ambrosius is a Finnish chamber music group that plays modern music on baroque instruments.  It originated in 1995 when three music students performed music of Frank Zappa at a school concert.  They added a fourth member and began touring in 1997, adding original music to their repertoire.  They have since increased to eight members and have produced two albums, The Zappa Album, and Metrix, the latter being original compositions blending classical, jazz, and rock.

Members

Current members 
 Olli Virtaperko (cello)
 Ere Lievonen (harpsichord)
 Eira Karlson (violin)
 Eija Kankaanranta (kantele)
 Susanne Kujala (organ)
 Veli Kujala (accordion)
 Joni Leino (drums)

Past members 
 Jonte Knif (keyboards etc.)
 Matti Vanhamäki (baroque violin)
 Anni Haapaniemi (baroque oboe)
 Jani Sunnarborg (baroque bassoon)
 Tuukka Terho (archlute)
 Ricardo Padilla (percussion)
 Jasu Moisio (baroque oboe, 1995-2000)

Albums

The Zappa Album
(Bis Records BIS-NL-CD-5013, © 2000)
Night School
Sofa
Black Page #2
Uncle Meat
Igor's Boogie
Zoot Allures
Big Swifty
T'mershi Duween
Alien Orifice
The Idiot Bastard Son
Rdnzl
The Orange County Lumber Truck
Echidna's Arf (Of You)
Inca Roads
G-Spot Tornado

Metrix
(Ambrosius Entertainment AMBRACD 002, © 2002)
Wällkommen II ( Virtaperko & Knif )
Pienet sienet ( Knif )
John ( Virtaperko )
USO ( Knif )
Momentum ( Ensemble Ambrosius )
Metrix ( Virtaperko )
Laiska Anni ( Virtaperko )
Hymni ( Virtaperko )

External links
Official Website

Finnish musical groups
Musical groups established in 1997